Vingelen Church is a parish church of the Church of Norway in Tolga Municipality in Innlandet county, Norway. It is located in the village of Vingelen. It is the church for the Vingelen parish which is part of the Nord-Østerdal prosti (deanery) in the Diocese of Hamar. The white, wooden church was built in a long church design in 1880 using plans drawn up by the architect Henrik Nissen. The church seats about 230 people.

History
The earliest existing historical records of the church date back to the 1590s, but the church was not built at that time. The first church in Vingelen was a wooden stave church that was possibly built during the 16th century. After the new church was built, the old church was torn down. In 1882, a new long church was built a few meters to the east of the old Trinity Church. The new church was designed by Henrik Nissen and the lead builder was Hans Johnsen. After the new neo-Gothic, Swiss chalet style building was completed, the old church was torn down. The new church was consecrated on 17 November 1880.

Media gallery

See also
List of churches in Hamar

References

Tolga, Norway
Churches in Innlandet
Long churches in Norway
Wooden churches in Norway
19th-century Church of Norway church buildings
Churches completed in 1880
16th-century establishments in Norway